Charles Robbins may refer to:

 Charles Robbins (Royal Navy officer) (1782–1805), charted coast of southern Australia
 Charles Robbins (athlete) (1921–2006), American long-distance runner
 Chuck Robbins (late 20th/early 21st c.), American businessman
 Charles Burton Robbins (1877–1943), American military officer

See also
 Charles Robins (born 1935), English cricketer